The Drover's Wife may refer to:

 "The Drover's Wife" (short story), an 1892 short story by Australian writer Henry Lawson
The Drover's Wife, a 1945 painting by Australian artist Russell Drysdale
 The Drover's Wife (play), a 2016 play by Leah Purcell, loosely based on Lawson's short story
The Drover's Wife: The Legend of Molly Johnson, a 2019 novel by Leah Purcell 
 The Drover's Wife: The Legend of Molly Johnson, a 2021 film by Leah Purcell

See also

The Drover's Wife (short story)#Cultural references